Amaru Entertainment (formerly Amaru Records) is a record label founded in 1997 by Afeni Shakur after the death of her son Tupac Amaru Shakur. The label was created to handle the release of Tupac's previously unreleased material, and was given the rights to release recordings made during his time at both Interscope and Death Row Records, as well as the rights to re-release his Interscope albums 2Pacalypse Now, Strictly 4 My N.I.G.G.A.Z..., Thug Life, Volume I, and Me Against the World. The label initially distributed its releases through Jive Records, beginning with R U Still Down? (Remember Me), but, as of 2011, the releases were being distributed by Interscope. Amaru has released 11 posthumous albums by 2Pac, as well as a documentary, titled Tupac: Resurrection. On May 2, 2016, Afeni Shakur died of a heart attack.

See also 
 Lists of record labels

References 

American record labels
Hip hop record labels
Interscope Records albums
Record labels established in 1997
Tupac Shakur